This is a list of former or once proposed cathedrals in Great Britain.

Introduction
The term former cathedral in this list includes any Christian church (building) in Great Britain which has been the seat of a bishop, but is not so any longer. The status of a cathedral, for the purpose of this list, does not depend on whether the church concerned is known to have had a formal "throne" (or cathedra) nor whether a formal territory or diocese was attached to the church. Before the development of dioceses, which began earlier in England than in Scotland and Wales, "such bishops as there were either lived in monasteries or were 'wandering bishops'". This list, therefore, includes early "bishop's churches" (a "proto-cathedral" is similar).

A former cathedral may be the building that lost its cathedral status or its site, whether now vacant or not. The loss of status may be because that bishopric is extinct, or was relocated. Sometimes a new cathedral was built near an older one, with the older building then used for other purposes, or demolished. Such a building or site counts as a former cathedral. Where a cathedral is modified or rebuilt on substantially the same site in a series of developments over time, the earlier versions are not counted here as former cathedrals (except for the extreme cases of London's "Old St Paul's" and Winchester's "Old Minster").

A former pro-cathedral is a church or former church (or site of a former church) which was once a temporary cathedral officially performing that role until its expected replacement by an intended permanent cathedral took place, usually by completion of a new cathedral built for that purpose.

A once proposed cathedral is a church that was proposed (usually by a church or civil authority) as a future cathedral, but for some reason, that particular proposal failed. In some cases, a later proposal succeeded and the church then became the seat of a bishop, but the church concerned will still be listed here for record purposes because of the earlier (failed) proposal.

England
References are to the English church's current use or its use prior to deconsecration.

Cathedrals founded before 1066
survivors becoming Church of England at the Reformation

Cathedrals founded (or proposed) between 1066 and 1539
survivors becoming Church of England at the Reformation

Cathedrals founded (or proposed) from 1540 to the present
Church of England from their foundation or when proposed

The cathedrals of St Albans and Southwell qualify for inclusion here because the 1540 proposals to raise them to cathedral status failed, as for many others in this section of the list. Later proposals succeeded in elevating them in 1877 and 1884 respectively, so they will be found also in lists of extant cathedrals.

Post-Reformation Roman Catholic Cathedrals

Scotland

For various reasons, formal dioceses were formed later in Scotland than in the rest of Great Britain. Bishops certainly existed in areas from the earliest Christian times (often from Irish monastic missionary activity), but the territory over which an early (often monastic) bishop operated was limited and ill-defined. Hence the term "bishop's church" is sometimes used for a seat used by an early bishop rather than the word "cathedral" which some expect to be attached to a formal diocese. Traditionally, the medieval Scottish diocesan system was held to have been largely created by King David I (reigned 1124–1153), though this is an oversimplification.

As the Scottish Reformation of 1560 developed, bishops and cathedrals became progressively marginalised and neglected. By Act of the Scottish Parliament in 1690 (confirming the Church's own final decision of 1689), the Church of Scotland finally became wholly Presbyterian, with no dioceses, no bishops, so no functioning cathedrals. At that date, all cathedrals of the Church of Scotland became former cathedrals. Some still use the title, but for honorific purposes only.

The Scottish Episcopal Church and the Roman Catholic Church in Scotland maintain their own diocesan structures with their own cathedrals and bishops.

Pre-Reformation Cathedrals (or proposed Cathedrals)
survivors becoming Church of Scotland at the Scottish Reformation (1560)

Post-Reformation Cathedrals

During and after the Scottish Reformation (1560) cathedrals were increasingly neglected and abandoned, but episcopacy continued to be supported by Stuart Kings. By Act of the Scottish Parliament in 1690 (confirming the Church's own final decision of 1689) the Church of Scotland became wholly Presbyterian, with no dioceses, no bishops, so no cathedrals as such. At that date, all Church of Scotland cathedrals became former cathedrals. Some still use the title, but for honorific purposes only.

The Scottish Episcopal Church and the Roman Catholic Church in Scotland maintain their own diocesan structures with their own cathedrals and bishops, as do the Orthodox churches.

Church of Scotland

Scottish Episcopal Church

Post-Reformation Roman Catholic Cathedrals

Wales

The end of Roman rule in Britain in the early 5th century left a Romano-British (later sometimes called "Celtic") church which became increasingly confined to the western parts of the island (principally modern Wales) as Angles, Saxons, and other invaders attacked and settled from the east. This church grew in size and influence in the west during the 6th and 7th centuries (a period sometimes characterised in Wales as "The Age of the Saints") with the conversion of ruling families (and consequently their peoples). Among the clergy, the title of "bishop" was more frequently used than later when large dioceses developed. The surviving evidence for most of these early bishoprics is now fragmentary and secondary at best, if not legendary. This list contains some better-evidenced examples.

The dioceses of the Welsh church, certainly from Norman times, were, sometimes reluctantly, part of the English church in the Province of Canterbury. This situation continued after the establishment of the Church of England at the Reformation until 1920, when the Church of England was disestablished in Wales, becoming the Church in Wales, a separate self-governing member of the Anglican Communion.

The Seven Bishop-Houses of the Kingdom of Dyfed
Collections of medieval Welsh Law record that the (early medieval) Kingdom of Dyfed had seven so-called "bishop-houses" (in Welsh, esgopty), following a general pattern of one bishop-house in each cantref. Their role is not clear, but they must have been relatively important ecclesiastical sites (with St Davids having a higher status than any of the others). Apart from the Bishop of St Davids, their heads were described as abbots, not bishops. Whether the other six were also bishoprics, former bishoprics, burial places of saint-bishops, or staging posts in the travels of (say) the bishop of St Davids is debated. They are included in this List of former cathedrals in Great Britain on the basis that any and all of them may well have been the seat of a bishop at some time. Details of all seven bishop-houses are given below for the sake of completeness, although St Davids has never ceased to be the seat of a bishop. The status of bishop-house, as distinct from the cathedral at St Davids, seems not to have survived the ending of the Kingdom of Dyfed (920), even less the arrival of the Normans. It should not be assumed that the sites identified below are exactly the original sites of the bishop-houses (with the probable exception of Llandeilo Llwydarth): some minor relocation over the course of centuries cannot be ruled out.

Isle of Man
The Isle of Man is not part of Great Britain (nor the United Kingdom) politically but it is ecclesiastically, hence its inclusion in this List. For the Church of England it forms the Diocese of Sodor and Man in the Province of York; for the Roman Catholic church, it is in the Archdiocese of Liverpool. The long-standing political status of the Isle of Man is that of a Crown Dependency.

See also
 Lists of cathedrals in the United Kingdom
 List of cathedrals in Ireland

Notes

References
 Barlow, Frank (2nd edn. 1979). The English Church 1000–1066. London: Longman. .
 Barrell, Andrew D. M. (2000). Medieval Scotland. Cambridge: Cambridge University Press. .
 Blair, John (2005). The Church in Anglo-Saxon Society. Oxford: Oxford University Press. 
 Bowen, E. G. (2nd edn. 1956). The Settlements of the Celtic Saints in Wales. Cardiff: University of Wales Press.
 Brabbs, Derry (1985).  English Country Churches. London: George Weidenfeld & Nicolson. 
 Bright, William (3rd edn. 1897).  Chapters of Early English Church History. Oxford: Clarendon Press.
 Cannon, Jon (2007). Cathedral. London: Constable & Robinson. 
 Chadwick, Nora K. (1961). The Age of the Saints in the Early Celtic Church. London: Oxford University Press. 
 Charles-Edwards, T. M. (1971). "The Seven Bishop-Houses of Dyfed" in Bulletin of the Board of Celtic Studies (University of Wales), 24, 1970–2, pp. 247–62.
 Charles-Edwards, T. M. (2013). Wales and the Britons 350–1064. Oxford: Oxford University Press. 
 Coplestone-Crow, Bruce (2009). Herefordshire Place-names. Almeley, Herefordshire: Logaston Press. 
 Cutts, Rev. Edward L. (1887). A Dictionary of the Church of England. London: Society for Promoting Christian Knowledge.
 Davies, John Reuben (2003). The Book of Llandaf and the Norman Church in Wales. Woodbridge: Boydell Press. .
 Davies, Wendy (1978). An Early Welsh Microcosm: Studies in the Llandaff Charters. London: Royal Historical Society. .
 Davies, Wendy (1979). The Llandaff Charters. Aberystwyth: The National Library of Wales. .
 Davies, Wendy (1982). Wales in the Early Middle Ages. Leicester: Leicester University Press. .
 Deanesly, Margaret (1961). The Pre-Conquest Church in England. London: Adam & Charles Black. 
 Dowden, John (1912). The Bishops of Scotland, ed. J. Maitland Thomson: Glasgow. 
 Edwards, David L. (1989). The Cathedrals of Britain. Norwich: Pitkin Pictorials.
 Evans, J. Wyn & Wooding, Jonathan M. (eds.). (2007). St David of Wales: Cult, Church and Nation. Woodbridge: Boydell Press.. .
 Fawcett, Richard (1997). Scottish Cathedrals. London: B. T. Batsford / Historic Scotland .
 Fernie, Eric (1983). The Architecture of the Anglo-Saxons. London: B T Batsford. 
 Fryde, E. B., Greenway, D. E., Porter, S. & Roy, L. (eds) (3rd edn. 1986). Handbook of British Chronology. London: Royal Historical Society. .
 Galloway, Peter (2000). The Cathedrals of Scotland. Dalkeith: Scottish Cultural Press .
 Gelling, (Canon) John (1998). A History of the Manx Church 1698–1911. Douglas: The Manx Heritage Foundation. .
 Godfrey, C. John (1962). The Church in Anglo-Saxon England. Cambridge: Cambridge University Press
 Green, Lionel 2002). Daughter Houses of Merton Priory. Morden: Merton Historical Society . 
 
 Hill, Geoffry (1900). English Dioceses. London: Elliot Stock.
 
 James, Heather (2007). "The geography of the cult of St David: a study of dedication patterns in the medieval diocese" in Evans & Wooding (2007), pp. 41–83
 Jankulak, Karen (2000). The Medieval Cult of St Petroc. Woodbridge: The Boydell Press .
 Jeffery, Paul (2004). The Collegiate Churches of England and Wales. London: Robert Hale .
 Jeffery, Paul (2012). England's Other Cathedrals. Port Stroud: The History Press .
 Jenkins, Simon (1999). England's Thousand Best Churches. Harmondsworth: Allen Lane The Penguin Press .
 Knowles, David & Hadcock, R. Neville (1971, 2nd edn.). Religious Houses England & Wales. London: Longman. 
 Macdonald, A. & Laing, L. (1967–68). "Early Ecclesiastical Sites in Scotland: a Field Survey, Part I" in Proceedings of the Society of Antiquaries of Scotland, Vol. 100, (1967–68), pp. 123–134.
 Macdonald, A. & Laing, L. (1969–70). "Early Ecclesiastical Sites in Scotland: a Field Survey, Part II" in Proceedings of the Society of Antiquaries of Scotland, Vol. 102 (1969–70), pp. 129–145. 
 Midmer, Roy (1979). English Mediaeval Monasteries 1066–1540. London: William Heinemann. 
 New, Anthony S. B. (1972). The Observer's Book of Cathedrals. London: Frederick Warne & Co.
 Olson, Lynette (1989). Early Monasteries in Cornwall. Woodbridge: Boydell Press. .
 OPS (1865) Origines Parochiales Scotiae. Edinburgh: W. H. Lizars.
 Orme, Nicholas (1996). English Church Dedications. Exeter: University of Exeter Press. 
 Orme, Nicholas (2007). Cornwall and the Cross. Chichester: Phillimore & Co. .
 Orme, Nicholas (2014). The Churches of Medieval Exeter. Exeter: Impress Books. .
 Pedler, Edward Hoblyn (1856). The Anglo-Saxon Episcopate of Cornwall; with some account of the Bishops of Crediton. London: John Petheram.
 Pepin, David (1994). Discovering Cathedrals. Aylesbury: Shire Publications.
 Petts, David (2009). The Early Medieval Church in Wales. Stroud: The History Press. .
 Phillips, C. W. (ed) (1973). Britain Before the Norman Conquest. Southampton: Ordnance Survey.
  Platten, Stephen (1999). Cathedrals & Abbeys of England. Norwich: Jarrold.
 Ray, Keith (2001). "Archaeology and the Three Early Churches of Herefordshire" in Malpas, Ann et al (eds) The Early Church in Herefordshire. Leominster: Leominster History Study Group. , pp. 99–148.
 Salter, Mike (2011). Medieval Abbeys and Cathedrals of Scotland. Malvern: Folly Publications .
 Slade, H. Gordon & Watson, George (1989). St Peter's Kirk, Thurso, Caithness c 1150–1832 in Proceedings of the Society of Antiquaries of Scotland Vol. 119, pp. 297–325.
 Smith, Nick Mayhew (2011). Britain's holiest places. Bristol: Lifestyle Press Ltd. .
 Tatton-Brown, Tim (1989). Great Cathedrals of Britain. London: BBC Books. .
 Thorold, Henry (1986). Collins Guide To Cathedrals, Abbeys and Priories of England and Wales. London: Collins.
 Tiller, Kate (ed) (2005). Dorchester Abbey: Church and People 635–2005. Witney: Stonesfield Press .
 Williams, A. H. (1962). An Introduction to the History of Wales: Volume 1 – Prehistoric Times to 1063 AD. Cardiff: University of Wales Press.
 Wooding, Jonathan M. & Yates, Nigel (eds) (2011). A Guide to the Churches and Chapels of Wales. Cardiff: University of Wales Press. .
 Yorke, B. A. E. (1982) "The Foundation of the Old Minster and the Status of Winchester in the Seventh and Eighth Centuries" in Proceedings of the Hampshire Field Club Archaeological Society, Vol. 38, (1982), pp. 75–83.

United Kingdom, former
 
Former cathedrals in Great Britain
 
 
Cathedrals in the United Kingdom